Entick v Carrington [1765] EWHC KB J98 is a leading case in English law and UK constitutional law establishing the civil liberties of individuals and limiting the scope of executive power. The case has also been influential in other common law jurisdictions and was an important motivation for the Fourth Amendment to the United States Constitution. It is famous for the dictum of Lord Camden: "If it is law, it will be found in our books. If it not to be found there, it is not law."

Facts

On 11 November 1762, the King's Chief Messenger, Nathan Carrington, and three other King's messengers, James Watson, Thomas Ardran, and Robert Blackmore, broke into the home of the Grub Street writer John Entick (1703?–1773) in the parish of St Dunstan, Stepney "with force and arms". Over the course of four hours, they broke open locks and doors and searched all of the rooms before taking away 100 charts and 100 pamphlets, causing £2,000 of damage. The King's messengers were acting on the orders of Lord Halifax, newly appointed Secretary of State for the Northern Department, "to make strict and diligent search for ... the author, or one concerned in the writing of several weekly very seditious papers entitled, The Monitor, or British Freeholder".

Entick sued the messengers for trespassing on his land.

Judgment

The trial took place in Westminster Hall presided over by Lord Camden, the Chief Justice of the Common Pleas. Carrington and his colleagues claimed that they acted on Halifax's warrant, which gave them legal authority to search Entick's home; they therefore could not be liable for the tort. However, Camden held that Halifax had no right under statute or under precedent to issue such a warrant and therefore found in Entick's favour. In the most famous passage Camden stated:

Hence Lord Camden ruled, as later became viewed as a general principle, that the state may do nothing but that which is expressly authorised by law, while the individual may do anything but that which is forbidden by law.

Significance
The judgment established the limits of executive power in English law: the state may act lawfully only in a manner prescribed by statute or common law.

It was also part of the background to the Fourth Amendment to the United States Constitution and was described by the Supreme Court of the United States as "a 'great judgment', 'one of the landmarks of English liberty', 'one of the permanent monuments of the British Constitution', and a guide to an understanding of what the Framers meant in writing the Fourth Amendment".

The importance of Entick v Carrington in limiting the ability of law enforcement to only act within the law was recognised in the post-Brexit decision of the EU to allow data sharing between the UK and EU.

Notes

References

See also
Everything which is not forbidden is allowed

1765 in case law
1765 in Great Britain
Court of Common Pleas (England) cases
Sovereign immunity
1765 in British law
United Kingdom administrative case law
United Kingdom constitutional case law